Isaac Florentine (born 28 July 1958) is an Israeli film director. He is best known for his martial arts and action genre films, namely Undisputed II: Last Man Standing (2006), Undisputed III: Redemption (2010), Ninja (2009), Ninja: Shadow of a Tear (2013) and Close Range (2015) and for launching the career of British actor Scott Adkins. Florentine completed his degree in Film & Television from Tel Aviv University.

Early life 
Florentine regularly visited local cinemas throughout his childhood in Israel, citing Sergio Leone and Bruce Lee as his biggest idols and subsequent film influences. As a young man he completed mandatory service in the Israeli Army for three years before studying Film & Television at Tel Aviv University. He also trained in martial arts since his childhood, learning judo and karate from the styles Kyokushin, Shito-ryu and Goju-Kai, and started teaching karate in 1978 before opening his own school in 1979, where he would also train regularly to this day. While studying at University he completed his first short film, Farewell Terminator (1987), which notably won seven awards at Mograbee Film Festival.

Career 
In 1988 he moved to America with his family to pursue a career in film. His first break came from meeting producers Ronnie Hadar and Jonathan Tzachor who invited him to join the production team behind TV series Mighty Morphin’ Power Rangers as a stunt coordinator and second unit director. After seeing his first short film, Cannon Films' Menahem Golan also offered Florentine the chance to direct his first feature film, Desert Kickboxer (1992).

Florentine is positive of his time on Power Rangers where he honed many skills and filmmaking techniques. However he would not embrace his now recognised directing style, shooting with minimal, clean edits in the mould of his other idols Buster Keaton and Charlie Chaplin, until his third feature film, High Voltage (1997).

As a next major step in his work, he cast young British actor Scott Adkins in a supporting role for Special Forces (2003), having received his demo tape, and it would mark the first of many collaborations, including producing, directing and even second unit directing, launching Adkins' career.

Florentine also directed the documentary The Life and Legend of Bob Wall (2003) and second unit directed The Legend of Hercules (2014).

Filmography

Acting
 Farewell, Terminator
 Marilyn Hotchkiss' Ballroom Dancing and Charm School
 Acts of Vengeance

Directing
 Farewell, Terminator (short-1987)
 Desert Kickboxer (1992)
 Savate (1995)
 Power Rangers Zeo: Zeo Quest (1996)
 High Voltage (1997)
 Bridge of Dragons (1999)
 Cold Harvest (1999)
 Power Rangers Time Force - Quantum Ranger: Clash for Control (2001)
 U.S. Seals II (2001)
 Special Forces (2003)
 The Life and Legend of Bob Wall (2003)
 Max Havoc: Curse of the Dragon (2004)-(final scenes)
 Undisputed II: Last Man Standing (2006)
 The Shepherd: Border Patrol (2008)
 Ninja (2009)
 Undisputed III: Redemption (2010)
 Assassin's Bullet (2012)
 Ninja: Shadow of a Tear (2014)
 Close Range (2015)
 Boyka: Undisputed (2016-uncredited)
 Acts of Vengeance (2017)
 Seized (2020)
 Hounds of War (2023)
 Hellfire (2023)
 Hounds of War 2(2024)
 Rise of The Super Soldier: The New Blood (TBA)
 The Inside Job (TBA)

Other
Power Rangers Super Megaforce - Consultant
The Legend of Hercules - (2014) - Second Unit Director
Boyka: Undisputed (2017) - Producer
211 (2018) - Producer

Awards

References

External links
Isaac Florentine - Official Website
Isaac Florentine Interview on Undisputed II
Isaac Florentine Article

Israeli film directors
Action film directors
Living people
Tel Aviv University alumni
1958 births